CouchSurfing is a hospitality exchange service by which users can request free short-term homestays or interact with other people who are interested in travel. It is accessible via a website and mobile app. It uses a subscription business model, and while hosts are not allowed to charge for lodging, members in some countries must pay a fee to access the platform.

History

Conception (1999–2004)
Couchsurfing was conceived by computer programmer and New Hampshire native Casey Fenton in 1999, when he was 21 years old. The idea arose after Fenton found a cheap flight from Boston to Iceland but did not have lodging. Fenton hacked into a database of the University of Iceland and randomly e-mailed 1,500 students asking for a homestay. He received between 50 and 100 offers and chose to stay at the home of an Icelandic rhythm and blues singer. On the return flight to Boston, he came up with the idea to create the website. He registered the couchsurfing.com domain name on 12 June 1999. Fenton was also inspired by a trip he took 2 years earlier to Egypt, where he was shown around by a local.

Couchsurfing International Inc. was formed on 2 April 2003 as a New Hampshire nonprofit corporation, with plans to apply for 501(c)(3) tax exemption.

The website was launched on 12 June 2004 with the cooperation of Dan Hoffer, Sebastien Le Tuan, and Leonardo Silveira.

Development of the website by volunteers (2006–2011)

From 2006 until the company raised financing in 2011, development of the website occurred mostly at events called "Couchsurfing Collectives", in which members met to voluntarily improve the website. Collectives took place in Montreal, Vienna, New Zealand, Rotterdam, Costa Rica, Samara, Alaska, Istanbul, and Thailand. However, the collectively-coded website was full of software bugs and crashes were common. Many members believed that the website needed to be redesigned from scratch. The collectives were also hindered by volunteers who just came to party and by tax laws in each jurisdiction.

In June 2006, problems with the website database resulted in much of it being irrevocably lost. Founder Casey Fenton posted online asking for help. A Couchsurfing Collective was underway in Montreal at the time and those in attendance raised $8,000 in donations and committed to recreate the website. In 2007, Google search volume for couchsurfing.org overtook the search volume for Hospitality Club.

Change to a for-profit corporation and financing (2011)
The company applied for 501(c)(3) tax status as a nonprofit organization in November 2007 but tax exempt status was rejected by the Internal Revenue Service in early 2011. The assets then needed to be acquired from the New Hampshire non-profit, which including legal fees, was to cost $1 million. In August 2011, a private for-profit Delaware C corporation, also called Couchsurfing International, Inc., which was formed on 3 May 2011, raised $7.6 million in a first-round financing led by Benchmark Capital and Omidyar Network and acquired the assets of the New Hampshire company. The New Hampshire non-profit company was dissolved on 4 November 2011.

The conversion to a for-profit corporation was objected to by many members since the guiding principles of the original non profit organisation promised that CouchSurfing operates as a nonprofit, a promise that was broken by Fenton and Hoffer. Founder Casey Fenton said he received 1,500 emails in the days after announcing the conversion.

The company was briefly certified as a B corporation (mistakenly labeled as a Benefit corporation in a blog post by Casey Fenton), but that certification was eventually removed.

In August 2012, Couchsurfing received an additional $15 million in funding from an investor group led by General Catalyst Partners, with participation by Menlo Ventures, as well as existing investors Benchmark Capital and Omidyar Network. The additional funding brought the company's total funding raised to $22.6 million. That year, the company launched mobile apps for iOS and Android.

The biggest HospEx platform in 2012, "CouchSurfing appears to fulfil the original utopian promise of the Internet to unite strangers across geographical and cultural divides and to form a global community" 
CouchSurfing used utopian rhetoric of "better world," "sharing cultures," and of much better access to global flows and networks of all sorts. It was featured as a means to achieve a cosmopolitan utopia. Commodification of CouchSurfing terminated "the existence of a project run as a flourishing commons, a cyber-utopian dream come true; an example of genuine exchange outside and free from the dominant logic of capital, a space highlighting cultural instead of monetary values, understanding instead of commerce. This space still exists, but  instead of outside, now within the market." After CouchSurfing became a for-profit corporation in 2011, some members urged others to join BeWelcome. Many brand ambassadors, who had become volunteers within CouchSurfing left to BeWelcome and other non-profit platforms because of the change in legal status and insufficient management transparency.

Management turnover (2012–2015)
Tony Espinoza, previously vice president and general manager of social-network games at MTV, served as CEO from April 2012 to October 2013. Under his leadership, driven by an aggressive advertising campaign, membership doubled; however, new users were less interested in hosting other travelers and in the "pay it forward" spirit of other members. Tensions between Fenton and Espinoza led to Fenton being fired from the company he founded, although at that time, he kept his seat on the board of directors. The company rented office space in San Francisco. By the end of Espinoza's tenure, the company had depleted half of its financing and laid off 40% of its staff.

Jennifer Billock, who had been head of product marketing, then took over as CEO.

New investment (2015)
In 2015, Couchsurfing required additional funding but did not have the metrics to raise a Series C round. Instead, the company received funding from Dugan Katragadda, a branch of Valencia Street Capital, led by Patrick Dugan (born 1980), who previously worked for NetSuite, Piper Jaffray, Palantir Technologies and Practice Fusion, a electronic medical records company. Dugan's investment was large enough to reconstitute the board of directors. Casey Fenton was removed from the board of directors due to differences with management and has since no longer been involved in the day-to-day operations of the company.

In June 2016, the company added a feature to its mobile app called "hangouts" that enables members to quickly meet with other nearby members.

Change to subscription business model (2020)
In May 2020, during the COVID-19 pandemic, the company switched to a subscription business model requiring users in some countries to pay a fee to access the platform.

See also
 Altruism
 Gift economy
 Hospitality
 List of hospitality exchange services
 Reputation system

References

External links

 

 

Hospitality exchange services
Hospitality companies established in 2003
American social networking websites
Social planning websites
Ethically disputed business practices
Commodification